The Target Rock National Wildlife Refuge is located just east of the village of Lloyd Harbor, New York, on the north shore of Long Island,  east of New York City. It is managed by the U.S. Fish and Wildlife Service as part of the Long Island National Wildlife Refuge Complex.

The  refuge is composed of mature oak-hickory forest, a  rocky beach, a brackish pond, and several vernal ponds. The land and waters support a variety of songbirds (particularly warblers during spring migration), mammals, shorebirds, fish, reptiles and amphibians. During the colder months, diving ducks are common offshore, while harbor seals occasionally use the beach and nearby rocks as resting sites. New York State and federally protected piping plover, least tern, and common tern depend on the refuge's rocky shore for foraging and rearing young.

The spring bloom at Target Rock is a reminder of its days as a garden estate, with flowering rhododendrons and mountain laurel.

References

External links
U.S. Fish and Wildlife Service: Target Rock National Wildlife Refuge

Huntington, New York
National Wildlife Refuges in New York (state)
Protected areas of Suffolk County, New York
Protected areas established in 1967
1967 establishments in New York (state)